This is a list of butterflies of Madagascar. About 303 species are known from Madagascar, a remarkable 210 of which are endemic.

The following list is not exhaustive.

Papilionidae

Papilioninae

Papilionini
Papilio dardanus meriones Felder & Felder, 1865
Papilio delalandei Godart, [1824]
Papilio demodocus Esper, [1798]
Papilio erithonioides Grose-Smith, 1891
Papilio grosesmithi Rothschild, 1926
Papilio morondavana Grose-Smith, 1891
Papilio oribazus Boisduval, 1836
Papilio epiphorbas Boisduval, 1833
Papilio mangoura Hewitson, 1875

Leptocercini
Graphium evombar (Boisduval, 1836)
Graphium colonna (Ward, 1873)
Graphium endochus (Boisduval, 1836)
Graphium cyrnus (Boisduval, 1836)

Troidini
Pharmacophagus antenor (Drury, [1773])

Pieridae

Coliadinae
Eurema brigitta pulchella (Boisduval, 1833)
Eurema desjardinsii (Boisduval, 1833)
Eurema floricola (Boisduval, 1833)
Eurema hapale (Mabille, 1882)
Catopsilia florella thauruma (Reakirt, 1866)

Pierinae
Colotis amata crowleyi (Sharpe, 1898)
Colotis evanthe (Boisduval, 1836)
Colotis guenei (Mabille, 1877)
Colotis mananhari (Ward, 1870)
Colotis vestalis castalis (Staudinger, 1884)
Colotis lucasi (Grandidier, 1867)
Colotis zoe (Grandidier, 1867)
Pinacopterix eriphia mabillei (Aurivillius, [1899])
Nepheronia buquetii pauliani Bernardi, 1959
Leptosia alcesta sylvicola (Boisduval, 1833)
Leptosia nupta viettei Bernardi, 1959

Pierini
Appias epaphia orbona (Boisduval, 1833)
Appias sabina confusa (Butler, 1872)
Mylothris phileris (Boisduval, 1833)
Mylothris smithii (Mabille, 1879)
Mylothris splendens Le Cerf, 1927
Dixeia charina narena (Grose-Smith, 1898)
Belenois antsianaka (Ward, 1870)
Belenois aurota aurota (Fabricius, 1793)
Belenois creona prorsus (Talbot, 1943)
Belenois grandidieri (Mabille, 1878)
Belenois helcida (Boisduval, 1833)
Belenois mabella Grose-Smith, 1891

Lycaenidae

Miletinae

Miletini
Spalgis tintinga (Boisduval, 1833)
Lachnocnema bibulus (Fabricius, 1793)

Theclinae

Theclini
Hypolycaena philippus ramonza (Saalmüller, 1878)
Hemiolaus ceres (Hewitson, 1865)
Hemiolaus cobaltina (Aurivillius, 1899)
Hemiolaus maryra (Mabille, [1887])
Leptomyrina phidias (Fabricius, 1793)
Iolaus argentarius Butler, 1879
Iolaus mermeros (Mabille, 1878)
Deudorix antalus (Hopffer, 1855)
Deudorix batikeli (Boisduval, 1833)
Deudorix dinochares Grose-Smith, 1887
Deudorix renidens (Mabille, 1884)
Deudorix wardii (Mabille, 1878)

Polyommatinae

Lycaenesthini
Anthene princeps smithii (Mabille, 1877)

Polyommatini
Cupidopsis cissus (Godart, [1824])
Cupidopsis jobates (Hopffer, 1855)
Pseudonacaduba sichela reticulum (Mabille, 1877)
Rysops scintilla (Mabille, 1877)
Lampides boeticus (Linnaeus, 1767)
Uranothauma artemenes (Mabille, 1880)
Cacyreus darius (Mabille, 1877)
Leptotes pirithous (Linnaeus, 1767)
Leptotes rabefaner (Mabille, 1877)
Zizeeria knysna (Trimen, 1862)
Zizina antanossa (Mabille, 1877)
Actizera atrigemmata (Butler, 1878)
Actizera drucei (Bethune-Baker, 1906)
Zizula hylax (Fabricius, 1775)
Azanus sitalces (Mabille, 1900)
Azanus soalalicus (Karsch, 1900)
Eicochrysops hippocrates (Fabricius, 1793)
Eicochrysops pauliani Stempffer, 1950
Eicochrysops sanguigutta (Mabille, 1879)
Euchrysops decaryi Stempffer, 1947
Euchrysops malathana (Boisduval, 1833)
Euchrysops osiris (Hopffer, 1855)
Freyeria minuscula (Aurivillius, 1909)
Freyeria trochylus (Freyer, [1843])
Lepidochrysops azureus (Butler, 1879)
Lepidochrysops caerulea Tite, 1961
Lepidochrysops grandis Talbot, 1937
Lepidochrysops leucon (Mabille, 1879)
Lepidochrysops turlini Stempffer, 1971

Riodininae

Nemeobiini
Saribia decaryi (Le Cerf, 1922)
Saribia perroti Riley, 1932
Saribia ochracea Riley, 1932
Saribia tepahi (de Boisduval, 1833)

Nymphalidae

Libytheinae
Libythea ancoata Grose-Smith, 1891
Libythea tsiandava Grose-Smith, 1891

Danainae

Danaini
Danaus chrysippus orientis (Aurivillius, 1909)
Amauris nossima (Ward, 1870)

Satyrinae

Melanitini
Gnophodes betsimena (Boisduval, 1833)
Melanitis leda (Linnaeus, 1758)

Satyrini
Heteropsis drepana Westwood, [1850]
Heteropsis vola (Ward, 1870)
Heteropsis paradoxa (Mabille, 1880)
Heteropsis ankoma (Mabille, 1878)
Heteropsis mabillei (Butler, 1879)
Heteropsis alaokola (Oberthür, 1916)
Heteropsis masoura (Hewitson, 1875)
Heteropsis antahala (Ward, 1872)
Heteropsis narova (Mabille, 1877)
Heteropsis erebina (Oberthür, 1916)
Heteropsis anganavo (Ward, 1871)
Heteropsis erebennis Oberthür, 1916
Heteropsis passandava (Ward, 1871)
Heteropsis difficilis (Mabille, 1880)
Heteropsis obscura (Oberthür, 1916)
Heteropsis wardii (Mabille, 1877)
Heteropsis strato (Mabille, 1878)
Heteropsis viettei Lees, 2003
Heteropsis andravahana (Mabille, 1878)
Heteropsis fuliginosa (Mabille, 1878)
Heteropsis exocellata (Mabille, 1880)
Heteropsis cowani (Butler, 1880)
Heteropsis ankaratra (Ward, 1870)
Heteropsis narcissus fraterna (Butler, 1868)
Heteropsis bicristata (Mabille, 1878)
Heteropsis parvidens (Mabille, 1880)
Heteropsis avelona (Ward, 1870)
Heteropsis uniformis (Oberthür, 1916)
Heteropsis iboina (Ward, 1870)
Heteropsis parva (Butler, 1879)
Heteropsis subsimilis (Butler, 1879)
Heteropsis pauper (Oberthür, 1916)
Heteropsis ankova (Ward, 1870)
Heteropsis turbata (Butler, 1880)
Heteropsis pallida (Oberthür, 1916)
Heteropsis andasibe Lees, 2003
Heteropsis strigula (Mabille, 1877)
Heteropsis maeva (Mabille, 1878)
Heteropsis laeta (Oberthür, 1916)
Heteropsis laetifica (Oberthür, 1916)
Heteropsis undulans (Oberthür, 1916)
Heteropsis anceps (Oberthür, 1916)
Heteropsis angulifascia (Butler, 1879)
Heteropsis turbans (Oberthür, 1916)
Heteropsis sabas (Oberthür, 1923)
Strabena goudoti (Mabille, [1885])
Strabena isoalensis Paulian, 1951
Strabena martini Oberthür, 1916
Strabena batesii (Felder & Felder, 1867)
Strabena nepos Oberthür, 1916
Strabena eros Viette, 1971
Strabena germanus Oberthür, 1916
Strabena affinis Oberthür, 1916
Strabena consobrina Oberthür, 1916
Strabena mandraka Paulian, 1951
Strabena niveata (Butler, 1879)
Strabena albivittula (Mabille, 1880)
Strabena cachani Paulian, 1950
Strabena excellens (Butler, 1885)
Strabena triophthalma Mabille, [1885]
Strabena ibitina (Ward, 1873)
Strabena tsaratananae Paulian, 1951
Strabena vinsoni (Guenée, 1865)
Strabena rakoto (Ward, 1870)
Strabena soror Oberthür, 1916
Strabena perroti Oberthür, 1916
Strabena modesta Oberthür, 1916
Strabena modestissima Oberthür, 1916
Strabena mabillei (Aurivillius, 1899)
Strabena mopsus (Mabille, 1878)
Strabena consors Oberthür, 1916
Strabena impar Oberthür, 1916
Strabena smithii Mabille, 1877
Strabena andilabe Paulian, 1951
Strabena daphne Viette, 1971
Strabena dyscola Mabille, 1880
Strabena sufferti (Aurivillius, 1899)
Strabena tamatavae (Boisduval, 1833)
Strabena zanjuka Mabille, [1885]
Strabena perrieri Paulian, 1951
Strabena andriana Mabille, [1885]
Strabena argyrina Mabille, 1878

Charaxinae

Charaxini
Charaxes analava Ward, 1872
Charaxes antamboulou Lucas, 1872
Charaxes cowani Butler, 1878
Charaxes andara Ward, 1873
Charaxes phraortes Doubleday, 1847
Charaxes andranodorus andranodorus Mabille, 1884
Charaxes andranodorus andrefana Viette, 1975
Charaxes cacuthis Hewitson, 1863
Charaxes zoolina betsimisaraka Lucas, 1872

Euxanthini
Charaxes madagascariensis (Lucas, 1843)

Apaturinae
Apaturopsis kilusa (Grose-Smith, 1891)
Apaturopsis paulianii Viette, 1962

Nymphalinae

Nymphalini
Vanessa hippomene madegassorum (Aurivillius, 1899)
Vanessa cardui (Linnaeus, 1758)
Junonia goudotii (Boisduval, 1833)
Junonia hierta paris Trimen & Bowker, 1887
Junonia oenone epiclelia (Boisduval, 1833)
Junonia orithya madagascariensis Guenée, 1865
Junonia musa
Junonia rhadama (Boisduval, 1833)
Salamis anteva (Ward, 1870)
Protogoniomorpha anacardii duprei (Vinson, 1863)
Precis andremiaja (Boisduval, 1833)
Precis eurodoce (Westwood, [1850])
Hypolimnas anthedon drucei (Butler, 1874)
Hypolimnas bolina jacintha (Drury, [1773])
Hypolimnas deceptor deludens Grose-Smith, 1891
Hypolimnas dexithea (Hewitson, 1863)
Hypolimnas misippus (Linnaeus, 1764)

Cyrestinae

Cyrestini
Cyrestis camillus elegans Boisduval, 1833

Biblidinae

Biblidini
Byblia anvatara (Boisduval, 1833)
Neptidopsis fulgurata (Boisduval, 1833)
Eurytela dryope lineata Aurivillius, 1899
Eurytela narinda Ward, 1872

Epicaliini
Sevenia amazoula (Mabille, 1880)
Sevenia howensis (Staudinger, 1886)
Sevenia madagascariensis (Boisduval, 1833)

Limenitinae

Limenitidini
Cymothoe lambertoni Oberthür, 1923
Cymothoe dujardini Viette, 1971
Pseudacraea imerina (Hewitson, 1865)
Pseudacraea lucretia apaturoides (Felder & Felder, [1867])
Pseudacraea peyrierasi Collins, 1991

Neptidini
Neptis kikideli Boisduval, 1833
Neptis saclava Boisduval, 1833
Neptis sextilla Mabille, 1882

Adoliadini
Aterica rabena Boisduval, 1833
Euptera kinugnana insularis Collins, 1995

Heliconiinae

Acraeini
Acraea dammii van Vollenhoven, 1869
Acraea hova Boisduval, 1833
Acraea igati Boisduval, 1833
Acraea mahela Boisduval, 1833
Acraea ranavalona Boisduval, 1833
Acraea turna Mabille, 1877
Acraea encedon (Linnaeus, 1758)
Acraea serena (Fabricius, 1775)
Acraea fornax Butler, 1879
Acraea lia Mabille, 1879
Acraea masamba Ward, 1872
Acraea siliana Oberthür, 1916
Acraea silia Mabille, [1885]
Acraea obeira Hewitson, 1863
Acraea sambavae Ward, 1873
Acraea strattipocles Oberthür, 1893
Acraea zitja Boisduval, 1833
Acraea calida Butler, 1878
Pardopsis punctatissima (Boisduval, 1833)

Vagrantini
Smerina manoro (Ward, 1871)
Phalanta madagascariensis (Mabille, 1887)
Phalanta phalantha aethiopica (Rothschild & Jordan, 1903)

Hesperiidae

Coeliadinae
Coeliades ernesti (Grandidier, 1867)
Coeliades fervida (Butler, 1880)
Coeliades fidia Evans, 1937
Coeliades forestan arbogastes (Guenée, 1863)
Coeliades rama Evans, 1937
Coeliades ramanatek (Boisduval, 1833)

Pyrginae

Celaenorrhinini
Celaenorrhinus ambra Evans, 1937
Celaenorrhinus humbloti (Mabille, 1884)

Tagiadini
Tagiades insularis Mabille, 1876
Tagiades samborana Grose-Smith, 1891
Eagris nottoana smithii (Mabille, [1887])
Eagris sabadius andracne (Boisduval, 1833)

Hesperiinae

Aeromachini
Fulda australis Viette, 1956
Fulda bernieri (Boisduval, 1833)
Fulda coroller (Boisduval, 1833)
Fulda gatiana (Oberthür, 1923)
Fulda imorina Evans, 1937
Fulda lucida Evans, 1937
Fulda pauliani Evans, 1952
Fulda rhadama (Boisduval, 1833)
Arnetta ellipsis (Saalmüller, 1884)
Arnetta fito Evans, 1937
Arnetta hyposticta (Mabille, 1898)
Xanthodisca ariel (Mabille, 1878)
Acleros leucopyga (Mabille, 1877)
Malaza carmides (Hewitson, 1868)
Malaza empyreus (Mabille, 1878)
Malaza fastuosus (Mabille, 1884)
Perrotia albiplaga Oberthür, 1916
Perrotia eximia (Oberthür, 1923)
Perrotia gillias (Mabille, 1878)
Perrotia kingdoni (Butler, 1879)
Perrotia malchus (Mabille, 1879)
Perrotia flora (Oberthür, 1923)
Perrotia howa (Mabille, 1876)
Perrotia ismael (Oberthür, 1916)
Perrotia ochracea (Evans, 1937)
Perrotia paroechus (Mabille, [1887])
Perrotia silvestralis (Viette, 1956)
Perrotia sylvia (Evans, 1937)
Perrotia varians (Oberthür, 1916)
Ploetzia amygdalis (Mabille, 1877)
Artitropa alaotrana Oberthür, 1916
Artitropa boseae (Saalmüller, 1880)
Artitropa hollandi Oberthür, 1916

Baorini
Pelopidas mathias (Fabricius, 1798)
Borbo borbonica (Boisduval, 1833)
Borbo gemella (Mabille, 1884)
Borbo havei (Boisduval, 1833)
Borbo ratek (Boisduval, 1833)
Parnara naso poutieri (Boisduval, 1833)

Heteropterinae
Hovala amena (Grose-Smith, 1891)
Hovala arota Evans, 1937
Hovala dispar (Mabille, 1877)
Hovala pardalina (Butler, 1879)
Hovala saclavus (Mabille, 1891)

See also
Geography of Madagascar
Ecoregions of Madagascar
Wildlife of Madagascar
List of moths of Madagascar

References

Seitz, A. Die Gross-Schmetterlinge der Erde 13: Die Afrikanischen Tagfalter. Plates
Seitz, A. Die Gross-Schmetterlinge der Erde 13: Die Afrikanischen Tagfalter. Text (in German)

 butterflies
Butterflies
Madagascar